The canton of Condé-en-Normandie (before 2021: Condé-sur-Noireau) is an administrative division of the Calvados department, northwestern France. Its borders were modified at the French canton reorganisation which came into effect in March 2015. Its seat is in Condé-en-Normandie.

It consists of the following communes:

Condé-en-Normandie
Les Monts d'Aunay (partly)
Périgny
Pontécoulant
Saint-Denis-de-Méré
Souleuvre en Bocage
Terres de Druance
Valdallière
La Villette

References

Cantons of Calvados (department)